The 2016 FBD Insurance League was an inter-county and colleges Gaelic football competition in the province of Connacht. As well as the five county teams, three colleges' teams competed: Institute of Technology, Sligo, NUI Galway and Galway-Mayo Institute of Technology (GMIT). Galway won.

Format
The teams are drawn into two groups of four teams. Each team plays the other teams in its group once, earning 2 points for a win and 1 for a draw. The two group winners play in the final.

Results

Section A

Section B

Final

References

FBD Insurance League
FBD Insurance League